Dendryphantes sanguineus is a jumping spider species in the genus Dendryphantes that lives in Zimbabwe. It was first described by Wanda Wesołowska in 2011.

References

Spiders described in 2011
Spiders of Africa
Endemic fauna of Zimbabwe
Salticidae
Taxa named by Wanda Wesołowska